The 5th constituency of the Hauts-de-Seine is a French legislative constituency in the Hauts-de-Seine département.

Description

Hauts-de-Seine's 5th constituency sits in the north of the department wedged between the Seine to the west and the Boulevard Périphérique which marks the border of Paris proper. It includes the prosperous suburbs of Clichy and
Levallois-Perret.

The seat has consistently returned conservative deputies from the non-Gaullist parties prior to 1988, then for Gaullist RPR and UMP from 1988 to 2017, when it was gained by the centrist LREM.

Historic Representative

Election results

2022

 
 
 
 
 
 
 
 
|-
| colspan="8" bgcolor="#E9E9E9"|
|-

2017

 
 
 
 
 
 
 
|-
| colspan="8" bgcolor="#E9E9E9"|
|-

2012

 
 
 
 
 
 
 
 
|-
| colspan="8" bgcolor="#E9E9E9"|
|-

2007

 
 
 
 
 
 
 
 
|-
| colspan="8" bgcolor="#E9E9E9"|
|-

2002

 
 
 
 
 
 
 
|-
| colspan="8" bgcolor="#E9E9E9"|
|-

1997

 
 
 
 
 
 
 
 
 
 
|-
| colspan="8" bgcolor="#E9E9E9"|
|-
 
 

 
 
 
 
 

* RPR dissident

Sources

 Official results of French elections from 1998: 

5